Suresh "Bhaiyyaji" Joshi (born 28 November 1947) is a prominent member of Rashtriya Swayamsewak Sangh (RSS). He was Sarkaryawah (General Secretary, the second in command) of RSS from 2009 to 2021 when he stepped down on health grounds.

Early life
Joshi was born on 28 November 1947 in Indore. He got his early education at Indore, however, he moved to Thane for higher studies and earned his bachelor's degree in arts. He got associated with RSS at a very early age.

Association with RSS

Joshi became Pracharak of RSS in 1975. He has served as Sah-sarakaryavah (Additional General Secretary) and Akhil Bharatiya Seva Pramukh. He was elected as Sarkaryavah (General Secretary) of RSS in 2009. He stepped down in 2021 due to health reasons and was replaced by Dattatreya Hosabale as Sara-Kaaryavaaha.

Views
Joshi is strongly opposed to Christian proselytism in India, claiming that Christian missionaries are exploiting poor and ignorant Hindus to convert them, although he said that he is not opposed to individuals changing faith out of the free will.

References

Living people
Rashtriya Swayamsevak Sangh pracharaks
1947 births
People from Indore